United Nations Security Council Resolution 187, adopted unanimously on March 13, 1964, after hearing representatives from Cyprus, Greece and Turkey and being deeply concerned over development in the area, the Council noted with assurance words from the Secretary-General that the forces about to become the Peace-Keeping Force in Cyprus were at the moment en route there.

The Council reaffirmed its call for all Member States for conform to their obligations under the Charter and requested the Secretary-General press on with his efforts.

See also
Cyprus dispute
List of United Nations Security Council Resolutions 101 to 200 (1953–1965)
United Nations Security Council Resolution 186

References
Text of the Resolution at undocs.org

External links
 

 0187
 0187
1964 in Cyprus
March 1964 events